The Olympus OM-D E-M1 Mark III is the third iteration of the flagship camera in the series of OM-D mirrorless interchangeable-lens cameras produced by Olympus on the Micro Four-Thirds system. Released on February 28, 2020, it replaced the Olympus OM-D E-M1 Mark II.

The E-M1 Mark III follows the E-M1 Mark II in embracing artificial intelligence-based features such as a deep learning autofocus system and multi-shot image processing to simulate neutral-density filters and a hi-res mode that allows the 20-megapixel camera to produce 50-megapixel images while handheld and 80-megapixel images while being on tripod. The camera also includes a 60 frames-per-second continuous shooting mode.

Features 

 20.4-megapixel Micro Four-Thirds sensor
 121-point autofocus system
 Image stabilization (up to 7.0EV or up to 7.5 with 'Sync IS' lenses)
 ISO range: 200–25600, with "LOW ISO 64"
 Handheld high-resolution shot mode
 Starry Sky AF for Astrophotography
 Up to 60 frames per second
 Multi-shot mode simulates ND filters (ND2, ND4, ND8, ND16, ND32)
 LCD viewfinder
3 inch screen
 420 shots per charge
 Dual SD card slots (1 x UHS-II, 1 x UHS-I)
 8-way joystick
 IPX1-rated weather sealing
 USB charging

Hi-resolution shot mode 

In tripod and handheld mode, the camera rapidly captures 8 images (Tripod) or 16 images (Handheld) which are combined into 160 Mpx (tripod) or 320 MPx (handheld) of data, which the camera combines into 80 MPx (10368×7776 px) images in tripod mode or 50 MPx (8160×6120 px) image in handheld mode. The tripod mode ISO limit is 1600, or ISO 6400 in handheld mode. Pictures can be saved in RAW or JPEG format. Handhold exposure can be set up to 4 seconds.

The benefit of hi-res mode is bigger resolution, low noise and an increase of dynamic range.

Reception 
The E-M1 Mark III was generally favored for improvements made over the Mark II, such as the introduction of a handheld mode and a lower base cost.

The camera took criticism for including the same 20-megapixel sensor, electronic viewfinder, and screen, as its predecessor, the Mark II. The same sensor is also present in the enthusiast-level Olympus OM-D E-M5 Mark III which was released just months earlier.

References

OM-D E-M1 Mark III
Cameras introduced in 2020